Platycheirus perpallidus is a species of hoverfly. It is a Holarctic species.

Description
External images
For terms, see: Morphology of Diptera. Anteroventral black hairs are strongly bent towards the base of the femur 2; Tibia 1 uniformly widened from base to apex.

See references for determination

Distribution
Palearctic: Norway and Finland south to northern France, Ireland east through Northern Europe and central Europe into European Russia and on through Siberia and the Russian Far East to the Pacific coast;Nearctic: from Alaska to New Brunswick and south to Utah.

Biology
Habitat: Sedge and reed beds in fen and mire and along rivers or the edge of lakes.
Flies April to September.

References

Diptera of Europe
Syrphinae
Insects described in 1901